Maria Dietz (7 February 1894 – 12 April 1980) was a German politician of the Christian Democratic Union (CDU) and former member of the German Bundestag.

Life 
Dietz was a member of the German Bundestag for two terms from 7 September 1949 to 6 October 1957. She was elected via the state list of the CDU in Rhineland-Palatinate.

Literature

References

1894 births
1980 deaths
Members of the Bundestag for Rhineland-Palatinate
Members of the Bundestag 1953–1957
Members of the Bundestag 1949–1953
Female members of the Bundestag
20th-century German women politicians
Members of the Bundestag for the Christian Democratic Union of Germany